Umarali Quvvatov (21 November 1968 – 5 March 2015) was a Tajikistani businessman and politician. He was the leader of the opposition Group 24. He was shot and killed on 5 March 2015 in Istanbul, Turkey.

Private life 
Umarali Izatovich Quvvatov was born on 21 November 1968 in the city of Dushanbe. He was married and had children.

Political positions 
Kuvvatov was a critic of Tajikistani president Emomalii Rahmon, accusing him of nepotism and corruption. He was a leader of the opposition Group 24, which he founded after going into exile in 2012. In October 2014 he publicly called on Tajikistanis to gather for a political protest on 10 October. However, no one showed up to the protests after Tajikistani authorities had blocked websites and deployed armored vehicles. The Supreme Court of Tajikistan ruled that Kuvvatov's Group 24 was an extremist movement and banned publications by it. Tajik authorities had blocked hundreds of websites after Group 24 used social media to call for an antigovernment protest in Dushanbe on 10 October 2014. Besides, a court in Dushanbe has sentenced Umedjon Solehov to 17 1/2 years in jail for his being a member of this opposition movement. Eurasianet reported that Kuvvatov was not widely known or liked before the failed protests, but that he became much more known afterwards.

Exile
In 2012 Kuvvatov went into exile to first Russia and later the United Arab Emirates after Tajikistan asked for his extradition. He was arrested in Dubai in September 2012 at the behest of Tajikistan. He was released in September 2013 after obtaining a pardon.

Kuvvatov went to Turkey, where he was arrested on 20 December 2014 on an alleged visa violation. His extradition was once more sought by Tajikistan, for extremism, economic crimes and hostage-taking. Turkey however refused extradition.

Death 
According to Turkish media reports, conspirators planned his murder for three months. At first they wanted to poison Kuvvatov at the joint dinner on the night of 5 to 6 March 2015 in Istanbul. Then the killers used weapons and Kuvvatov was shot dead with a single bullet to his head when he got outside trying to reach the nearest hospital.

Rahmatullo Zoyirov, chairman of the Social Democratic Party of Tajikistan, told RFE/RL's Tajik Service that Quvvatov's killing had been pre-planned. Quvvatov's wife, Kumriniso Hafizova, told RFE/RL on 8 March that she, her husband and their two sons had been invited for dinner at the house of Sulaimon Qayumov, a 30-year-old Tajik citizen. Qayumov has been living in Turkey for three months and positioned himself as a Quvvatov sympathizer. After dinner, Quvvatov and his family members felt sick and rushed out for fresh air. When they were outside, an unidentified Tajik-speaking man approached Quvvatov from behind, fired a single shot to his head and immediately fled the scene. The 47-year-old entrepreneur was already dead when medics arrived at the scene and police searched the area for evidence. Turkish media also reported that Mr Kuvatov's wife and children had symptoms of poisoning.

Some observers have drawn parallels between the murder of Umarali Quvvatov and the late February assassination of Russian opposition leader Boris Nemtsov. Speaking to journalists on 6 March, Muhiddin Kabiri, the leader of the opposition Islamic Renaissance Party of Tajikistan, compared the killing to the recent deaths of Nemtsov and Rakhat Aliyev, the former son-in-law of Kazakh President Nursultan Nazarbayev. Rajabi Mirzo, an independent political analyst, described Quvvatov's death as a "shameful and terrible event" that could be compared with Nemtsov's killing. "Nemtsov was killed the day before the announced rally, and Quvatov after the announcement of the [parliamentary] election results," he wrote.

See also
Maksud Ibragimov - another Tajik opposition politician towards whom an assassination attempt was made in 2014
 Zayd Saidov - Tajik businessman imprisoned for 26 year in 2013 after an attempt to launch a new political party

References

1968 births
2015 deaths
Assassinated Tajikistani politicians
People from Dushanbe
People murdered in Turkey
Tajikistani businesspeople
Tajikistani politicians
Tajik National University alumni
Tajikistani exiles
Deaths by firearm in Turkey
Tajikistani people murdered abroad